Ingeborg Eriksdotter ( – 24/26 March 1287) was Queen of Norway and the wife of King Magnus VI. She was born a Danish princess, daughter of Eric IV of Denmark. As queen dowager, she played an important part in politics during the minority of her son King Eirik II of Norway in 1280-82.

Biography
Ingeborg was born to Eric IV of Denmark and Jutta of Saxony. Ingeborg was only about six years-old when her father was killed. Her mother returned to Saxony and married Count Burchard VIII of Querfurt-Rosenburg.  In large part, Ingeborg and her three sisters lived in the court of her uncle King Christopher I of Denmark and Queen Margaret Sambiria.  The four sisters were heirs to substantial lands in Denmark. The struggle to claim Ingeborg's inheritance from her murdered father would later involve Norway in intermittent conflicts with Denmark for decades to come.

Ingeborg was promised in marriage by the Danish regency government to Magnus, the son of King Haakon IV of Norway. Ingeborg arrived in Tønsberg on 28 July 1261, after she being retrieved  at the instruction of King Haakon from the monastery in  Horsens (dominikanerkloster ved Horsens).  On 11 September 1261, she married Magnus in Bergen.   Magnus and Ingeborg were crowned directly after their marriage, and Magnus was given the district of Ryfylke for his personal upkeep. The marriage was described as happy.

On 16 December 1263 King Haakon IV of Norway died while fighting the Scottish king over the Hebrides, and Magnus became the ruler of Norway. Ingeborg is not known to have played any part in politics as queen. Her two older sons Olaf (1262 – 15 March 1267) and Magnus (b. and d. 1264) died in infancy, but the youngest two would later become Kings of Norway: Eric II (1268 – 13 July 1299) and Haakon V (ca. 10 April 1270 – 8 May 1319).

In 1280, she became a widow. Ingeborg was an important figure in the leadership of the country during the minority of King Eirik, though she was not formally named regent. Her influence grew after her son was declared adult in 1283. Her principal ally was Alv Erlingsson, who had been a second cousin of her husband King Magnus and served as the governor Borgarsyssel which today makes up the county of Østfold.

During the reign of her cousin King Eric V of Denmark, Ingeborg  begun a feud regarding  her inheritance, which she had never received.  This largely private feud caused hostility between Norway and the German Hanseatic cities and a tense relationship with Denmark. Several Danish nobles, including Count Jacob of Halland, took her side against the Danish monarch, but she died before the affair was finished.

References

Other sources
Koht, Halvdan Norske dronningar  (1926)

|-
	

House of Estridsen
1244 births
1287 deaths
Norwegian royal consorts
Danish princesses
Regents of Norway
13th-century women rulers
House of Sverre
Fairhair dynasty
13th-century Norwegian people
13th-century Norwegian women
13th-century Danish people
13th-century Danish women
Daughters of kings
Queen mothers